Thomas Michael Dunstan Voyce (born 5 January 1981) is a former English rugby union player who played at wing or fullback. He previously played for England.

Voyce married Anna Wood in September 2015.

Biography
Born 5 January 1981 in Truro, Cornwall.

Voyce's great uncle, Anthony Thomas Voyce, won 27 caps for England, while playing for Gloucester Rugby, during the 1920s and was a member of the first double Grand Slam winning team. He went on to become President of the RFU in 1960–61.

Voyce was educated at Penair School, Truro and then studied at King's College, Taunton.

Outside the rugby field, Voyce is an Ambassador of the Wooden Spoon Society.

Career
He first showed promise playing mini rugby at Penryn RFC in his native Cornwall, before going on to play for Truro RFC U15s and U16s.

Bath 1997–2003
Having left Cornwall at 16, he eventually joined Bath where he worked his way through the club's lower sides and into the Zurich Premiership line up. At the same time he established himself in the England Under 21 side. He was selected for England's 2001 tour to North America, where he won his first cap against the USA.

Wasps 2003–2009
In 2003 he moved to London, to join Wasps for the 2003–04 season and quickly established himself as a first team regular. He played in 34 of his club's 35 matches that season, scoring 15 tries in the process. At the end of the season Wasps won the Premiership final against his former club Bath. He also helped Wasps win the Heineken Cup that season. In November 2004 he scored the quickest try in Premiership history when he gathered a loose ball from kick off and crossed by the posts in 9.63 seconds against Harlequins, beating Martin Corry's record by 14 seconds. Voyce was in the starting line up for the 2004 England summer tour matches against New Zealand in Auckland and Australia in Brisbane. He helped Wasps win their third consecutive Premiership title in 2005, this time scoring a try in the final against Leicester.

In 2005 he marked his first Twickenham Test appearance with two tries against Samoa.

Voyce was selected for every match of the 2006 Six Nations Championship. Initially selected for the bench in England's opener against Wales, Voyce quickly found himself on the pitch replacing injured Josh Lewsey, also scoring a try in the process. This injury meant that Voyce secured the number 15 jersey for the next game against Italy. However, Lewsey was soon fit again in time for the 3rd game, which meant that Voyce was once again relegated to the bench. After losing two games in a row, changes were made to the England squad meaning England regular Lewsey was dropped, opening up the fullback position for Voyce to start against Ireland. Later that year, he played his last international to date against Australia, in Sydney. His performance in such game was – according to himself – quite poor, and this might have jeopardised his international career.

Voyce won his second Heineken Cup with Wasps in 2007. However injury ruled him out of Wasps' victory in the 2007–08 Premiership final.

Gloucester 2009–2012
In March 2009, it was announced that he would join Gloucester Rugby from the 2009–10 season.

April 2012, departure from Gloucester announced.

London Welsh 2012–2013
In October 2012, he joined London Welsh. On 16 May 2013, it was announced Tom Voyce would retire from all forms of rugby with immediate effect.

Post-rugby career
Tom Voyce now works at Investec Bank Plc.

References

External links

 Gloucester Rugby profile
Wasps profile
 England profile
Profile at scrum.com

1981 births
Living people
Bath Rugby players
Cornish rugby union players
England international rugby union players
English rugby union players
Gloucester Rugby players
London Welsh RFC players
People educated at King's College, Taunton
Rugby union fullbacks
Rugby union players from Truro
Rugby union wings
Wasps RFC players